The live action drama series , also known as Case Closed, is based on the manga of the same name. As of 2012, four television specials and a TV series were made.

The first television special was titled,  and was aired on October 2, 2006. The story follows Shinichi Kudo as he investigates a kidnapping aboard a cruise ship. It features Shun Oguri as the teenage Kudo and Tomoka Kurokawa as Ran Mori. The second television special, entitled , aired on December 17, 2007. The plot follows Kudo and Shiho Miyano as they hide from the Black Organization.

A third TV special entitled, aired on April 15, 2011 and featured Junpei Mizobata as Shinichi Kudo and Shioli Kutsuna as Ran Mori. The plot follows Kudo's investigation on murders that are blamed on a mythical bird. The fourth TV special, titled  aired on April 12, 2012. The plot follows Kudo's investigation of a murder on a plane and later in Kyoto.

The cast from the third TV special were used for the TV series,  which aired between July 7, 2011 and September 29, 2011. It follows Shinichi, Ran and Kogoro Mori as they wake up trapped in a room by a crazed fan who admires Shinichi's abilities. Each room contains a device which when a keyword connected to the case is entered, grants them further access of the room. The live action series is produced by Yoshinori Horiguchi, Shi Shirakawa, Koki Endo, and Masako Kuraibu with music by Koji Endo. The theme music used is  performed by Yu-Yu (Rhythm Zone).



Episode list

TV specials

Kudo Shinichi he no Chosenjou

References

External links
 

Case Closed
Lists of episodes